Cybulino  is a village in the administrative district of Gmina Bobolice, within Koszalin County, West Pomeranian Voivodeship, in north-western Poland.

For the history of the region, see History of Pomerania.

The village has a population of 250.

Notable residents
 Ewald Christian von Kleist (1715–1759), German poet

References

Cybulino